The Fortaleza del Cerro, also known as Fortaleza General Artigas, is a fortress situated in Montevideo, Uruguay overlooking the Bay of Montevideo. It belongs to the barrio of Casabó, at the west of Villa del Cerro. It holds a dominant position on the highest hill of the department of Montevideo (popularly known as Cerro de Montevideo) with an altitude of 134 meters above sea level, on the opposite side of the bay. Its function was to defend the population of Montevideo and its port, on the río de la Plata. Governor Francisco Javier de Elío ordered construction in 1809 and it was completed in 1839; this was the last Spanish fort built in Uruguay. It has housed the Military Museum since 1916.

Monument and Sight
It has been a National Monument since 1931 and has housed a military museum since 1916. Today it is a well-known attraction for tourists visiting Montevideo.

See also

 List of lighthouses in Uruguay

References

External links 
 www.uruguaytotal.com/virtual/cerro (Spanish)
 www.montevideo.com (Spanish)
 Revista Raíces - Historia de la Fortaleza del Cerro (Spanish)

Forts in Uruguay
Buildings and structures in Montevideo
Monuments and memorials in Montevideo
Lighthouses in Uruguay
Villa del Cerro
Military and war museums in Uruguay
1802 establishments in Uruguay
José Gervasio Artigas